Sphragis is a Greek word for "seal". It may refer to:

 Sphragis (literary device), an explicit authorial statement in which an author identifies themselves
 Mating plug, a gelatinous secretion used in the mating of some species